Frédéric Barbier can refer to:

 Frédéric Barbier (composer) (1829–1889), French composer
 Frédéric Barbier (historian) (born 1952), French historian
 Frédéric Barbier (politician) (born 1960), French politician